Salvia spathacea, the California hummingbird sage, hummingbird sage, or pitcher sage, is a species of flowering plant in the family Lamiaceae, native to southern and central California growing from sea level to . This fruity scented sage blooms in March to May with typically dark rose-lilac colored flowers. It is cultivated in gardens for its attractive flowering spikes and pleasant scent.

Distribution
The pitcher sage is found in the California coast ranges from the Sacramento Valley south to the San Diego area. It is a common species that grows on open or shady slopes in moist oak woodland, chaparral, and coastal sage scrub not far from the Pacific Ocean.

Description
Each plant produces a single flowering stem which rarely branches. Like many species in the mint family it has very pronounced square stems, and the entire plant is covered with wavy glandular hairs.

Its bright green leaves are 8–20 cm. long, and highly aromatic when crushed or touched. They are oblong to almost arrowhead-shaped at the base, and can be puckered with wrinkles, and have rounded teeth at the leaf edges. Like the rest of the plant, they are covered with hairs which make the plant soft to the touch. The hairs tend to be denser on the bottom surface of the leaves.

The inflorescences are subtended by showy bracts which can be ruby red to dark maroon or brown. The calyx is 1.5 to 3 cm. long. It is two-lipped, with the upper lip entire, or unlobed. Each corolla is tubular and 2.5-3.5 cm. long, with 2 lips. The upper lip of the corolla is 7–8 mm., with two shallow lobes, while the lower lip is longer, 10–12 mm. The two fertile stamens are attached to the corolla tube. The style is forked. Both the style and the stamens protrude outside the corolla tube. Flowers vary in color from green through light pink and magenta to purple.

The fruits are 4 nutlets, dark brown to black in color. They are round to ovate, with a length of 3.5 to 6.5 mm.

Cultivation
Salvia spathacea is easy to grow in the garden, and is a very useful groundcover for dry shade under oaks. Unlike other California native sages, it spreads from underground rhizomes. It will also grow in the open, in ordinary garden soil, in part or even full sun. Supplemental water can help encourage a longer flowering season, but a late summer rest from watering is desirable. As the alternative common name suggests, it is used by feeding hummingbirds and will attract them to the garden. Deer and gophers generally leave this strongly aromatic plant alone.

It easily propagates by seeds or rhizomes. Seeds should be collected as early as possible, or they can be predated by insects. S. spathacea can get powdery mildew, which can be treated with a  spray of milk diluted in water.  Several cultivars exist although some selections are stronger than others. One showy cultivar is "Confetti," which has both yellow and pink flowers on the same plant. The more robust cultivars include "Powerline Pink," with magenta to crimson flowers, which will grow in hot sun, even inland, and "Avis Keedy," which has light yellow flowers.

Salvia spathacea has gained the Royal Horticultural Society's Award of Garden Merit.

References

Averett, Deborah Engle; Neisess, Kurt R.; Jepson Manual treatment for Salvia spathecea. Jepson Flora Project Interchange, Regents of the University of California.
Bornstein, Fross, and O'Brien, 2005. California Native Plants for the Garden. Cachuma Press

External links
Calflora Database: Salvia spathacea (hummingbird sage)
 Jepson eFlora—TJM2: Salvia spathacea
Salvia spathacea — U.C. Photo gallery

spathacea
Endemic flora of California
Natural history of the California chaparral and woodlands
Natural history of the California Coast Ranges
Natural history of the Central Valley (California)
Natural history of the Channel Islands of California
Natural history of the San Francisco Bay Area
Natural history of the Santa Monica Mountains
Natural history of the Transverse Ranges
Garden plants of North America
Drought-tolerant plants
Plants described in 1892
Flora without expected TNC conservation status